Basketball events were contested at the 1999 Summer Universiade in Palma de Mallorca, Spain.

References
 Universiade basketball medalists on HickokSports

Universaiie
1999 Summer Universiade
1999
Universiade